Khao Noi–Khao Pradu Non-hunting Area is a non-hunting area in Mueang Phitsanulok District, Wang Thong District and Wat Bot District of Phitsanulok Province.

Geography
Streams flow into the Khwae Noi River a tributary of the Nan River.

Topography
Landscape is mostly covered by forested mountains, such as Khao Noi in the north and Khao Pradu in the south. 
The total mountained area is 88%, divided into 33% high slope mountain area (upper-slopes, shallow valleys, mountain tops and deeply incised streams) and 55% hill slope area (open slopes, u-shaped valleys and midslope ridges). There are plains for 12%.

History
In 1992 a survey was set up by the Phitsanulok Regional Forestry Office for Khao Noi–Khao Pradu forest area and  many wild animals were found here. In 1994 the forest area on both sides of the Khwae Noi River were surveyed and also many kinds of wild animals were found there. Later in 1998 the Ministry of Agriculture and Cooperatives proposed that the area should be Khao Noi–Khao Pradu Non-hunting Area, which was publized in the Government Gazette, volume 115, issue 43 Ngor, dated May 28, 1998. Since 2002 this non-hunting area has been managed by Protected Areas Regional Office 11 (Phitsanulok).

Flora
The non-hunting area features mixed deciduous forest (89%), agricultural area (6%), and abandoned farms (5%).

Fauna
Mammals, there are 20 species from 13 families, represented by one species:

Birds, there are some 120 species, of which 70 species of passerine from 30 families, represented by one species:

and 50 species of non-passerine from 19 families, represented by one species:

Reptiles, there are 12 species from 8 families, represented by one species:

Amphibians, there are 6 species from 3 families, represented by one species:

Location

See also
 List of protected areas of Thailand
 List of Protected Areas Regional Offices of Thailand

References

Non-hunting areas of Thailand
Geography of Phitsanulok province
Tourist attractions in Phitsanulok province
1998 establishments in Thailand
Protected areas established in 1998